Lord Arthur's Bed is a play by English playwright Martin Lewton.  The play premiered at the Brighton Festival in on 14 May 2008. It subsequently toured nationally in 2008, and transferred to Dublin in 2009.

The play is set in 2008 following the Civil Partnership of the two protagonists, who find themselves living in a house once occupied by Lord Arthur Clinton MP and transvestite Ernest Boulton. It caused some considerable scandal on its opening in Brighton, when the Brighton newspaper "The Argus" led a story on the play with the headline "Sexually Explicit Play to be Staged in Church". As a result, the play sold out throughout its Brighton run.

Characters
 Donald
 Jim

Productions

The original (2008) tour was produced at the following venues:

The Brighton Fringe
The Carriageworks Theatre, Leeds
The Rondo Theatre, Bath
The Victoria Theatre, Settle
The Square Chapel, Halifax
The Lowry, Manchester
The Drill Hall, London

In May 2009 the play was performed at the New Theatre in Dublin as part of the 2009 International Dublin Gay Theatre Festival

Cast

The original (touring) cast was as follows:

 Donald : Paul Kendrick
 Jim : Paul Spruce

At the New Theatre in Dublin in May 2009, the cast was as follows:

 Donald : Spencer Charles Noll
 Jim : Paul Spruce

At The King's Head in March–April 2010, the cast was as follows:

 Donald : Spencer Charles Noll
 Jim : Ruaraidh Murray

Awards and nominations

 2009 Michael Mac Liammoir award for best actor: Spencer Charles Noll

References 

 
 

2008 plays
English plays
LGBT-related plays
Plays based on real people
Plays set in England
Fiction set in 2008